The 1985 London Marathon was the fifth running of the annual marathon race in London, United Kingdom, which took place on Sunday, 21 April. The elite men's race was won by home athlete Steve Jones in a time of 2:08:16 hours and the women's race was won by Norway's Ingrid Kristiansen in 2:21:06. Kristiansen's time was a marathon world record, knocking over a minute and a half off Joan Benoit's previous mark.

In the wheelchair races, Britain's Chris Hallam (2:19:53) and Ireland's Kay McShane (2:47:12) set course records in the men's and women's divisions, respectively.

Around 83,000 people applied to enter the race, of which 22,274 had their applications accepted and 17,500 started the race. A total of 15,873 runners finished the race.

Results

Men

Women

Wheelchair men

Wheelchair women

References

Results
Results. Association of Road Racing Statisticians. Retrieved 2020-04-24.

External links

Official website

1985
London Marathon
Marathon
London Marathon